Undead is a supplement for fantasy role-playing games published by Mayfair Games in 1986.

Contents
Undead is a campaign setting that describes the volcanic realm of Verdaise, the land of the undead.  The book includes many new undead monsters, spells, and magic items, a description of undead war tactics, plus a scenario set in Verdaise for character levels 6-9.

The campaign setting is the Verdaise region, on the floor of a vast caldera, ruled by five Lichlords in the service of the evil god Dierguth. This deity, when angered at some Elgaard dwarves, blew up them and their mountain, leaving the deep, bowl-shaped land of volcanoes, molten lakes, and lava tunnels that the Lichlords call home.  Before long, the Lichlords had undead legions, spilling out over the neighboring lands, conquering their neighbors and recruiting the victims. 200 dwarven freedom fighters have slipped back into Verdaise and crawled into the lava tunnels, vowing to reclaim their homeland.

Publication history
Undead was written by Laurel Nicholson and John Keefe, with a cover by Michael Whelan, and was published by Mayfair Games in 1986 as an 80-page book. The supplement was part of the Role Aids line.

Reception
Undead was reviewed in Dragon #126 (October 1987) by Ken Rolston.  He admitted that he was "a bit surprised at how good this supplement turned out. From the title, I envisioned an encyclopedic treatment of the standard undead types of most FRP games [...] with a couple of standard scenarios in which undead lords hide down in deep dungeons, guarded by scads of dead guys, daring bold adventurers to come in after them." Rolston added, "The volcanic terrain on the floor of the caldera [...] makes a unique and colorful campaign setting. The dead guys are nicely rendered. The discussion of undead unit tactics is pretty convincing [...] and there are some swell original spells, magical items, monsters, and grand sorcerous rituals that are specially tailored to the atmosphere and gaming elements of a campaign focusing on the undead." He continued: "The adventure is fairly linear, and there's quite a bit of dragging-around-by-the-nose, but this supplement is a good example of the genre. There are plenty of staging hints for hamming up the presentation, and plenty of resources for keeping the action moving and the players busy solving problems, parlaying with NPCs, and bashing dead guys. The final set piece really won my admiration." Rolston concluded his review by saying: "This is a quality AD&D game campaign supplement, comparable to some of TSR's better supplements. The setting is imaginative and fantastic; the dead guys are grim and menacing; there are plenty of neat new magics and monsters; and the adventure, while a bit contrived and manipulative, has some nice bits. The unusual two-color printing looks smart, and the graphic design is first-class. Nicholson and company have done a commendable job in advancing the reputation of Mayfair's modules."

Lawrence Schick in his book Heroic Worlds calls the book "Pretty good."

References

Fantasy role-playing game supplements
Role Aids
Role-playing game supplements introduced in 1986